Claudio Fäh (born 29 March 1975) is a Swiss film director, producer and screenwriter.

Career 
Fäh has directed films such as Coronado, Hollow Man 2, Sniper: Reloaded and Sniper: Ultimate Kill, as well as webisodes of Ghost Whisperer: The Other Side, the online companion series to CBS's Ghost Whisperer.

During fall 2013, he directed Northmen: A Viking Saga.

Personal life
As of 1999, Fäh lives in Los Angeles, California. He married Martina Meier, a doctor in 2003. Together, they have two daughters.

Filmography

 Ghost Whisperer: The Other Side (16 episodes) – "Episode #1.1", "Episode #1.2", "Episode #1.3", "Episode #1.4", "Episode #1.5", "Episode #1.6", "Episode #1.7", "Episode #1.8", "Episode #1.9", "Episode #2.0", "Episode #2.1", "Episode #2.2", "Episode #2.3", "Episode #2.4", "Episode #2.5", "Episode #2.6", "Episode #2.7", "Episode #2.8"

References

External links

1975 births
Living people
Swiss film directors
Swiss film producers
Swiss screenwriters
Male screenwriters